Manturikha is a rural locality (a settlement) in Kabansky District, Republic of Buryatia, Russia. The population was 84 as of 2010. There are 11 streets.

Geography 
Manturikha is located 61 km southwest of Kabansk (the district's administrative centre) by road. Boyarsky is the nearest rural locality.

References 

Rural localities in Kabansky District
Populated places on Lake Baikal